Shahrak-e Gharbi (also Romanized as Shahrak-e Gharbī) is a village in Shahrak Rural District of Eslamabad District of Parsabad County, Ardabil province, Iran. At the 2006 census, its population was 1,425 in 384 households, at which time it was in the former Qeshlaq-e Jonubi Rural District of the Central District. The following census in 2011 counted 1,009 people in 260 households. The latest census in 2016 showed a population of 745 people in 218 households, by which time Eslamabad District had been formed with two rural districts; it was the largest village in Shahrak Rural District.

References 

Parsabad County

Towns and villages in Parsabad County

Populated places in Ardabil Province

Populated places in Parsabad County